Cytochrome P450 family 24 subfamily A member 1 (abbreviated CYP24A1) is a member of the cytochrome P450 superfamily of enzymes encoded by the CYP24A1 gene. It is a mitochondrial monooxygenase which catalyzes reactions including 24-hydroxylation of calcitriol (1,25-dihydroxyvitamin D3).    It has also been identified as vitamin D3 24-hydroxylase.()

Function 
CYP24A1 is an enzyme expressed in the mitochondrion of humans and other species. It catalyzes hydroxylation reactions which lead to the degradation of 1,25-dihydroxyvitamin D3, the physiologically active form of vitamin D. Hydroxylation of the side chain produces calcitroic acid and other metabolites which are excreted in bile.

CYP24A1 was identified in the early 1970s and was first thought to be involved in vitamin D metabolism as the renal 25-hydroxyvitamin D3-24-hydroxylase, modifying calcifediol (25-hydroxyvitamin D) to produce 24,25-dihydroxycholecalciferol (24,25-dihydroxyvitamin D).  Subsequent studies using recombinant CYP24A1 showed that it could also catalyze multiple other hydroxylation reactions at the side chain carbons known as C-24 and C-23 in both 25-OH-D3 and the active hormonal form, 1,25-(OH)2D3.  It is now considered responsible for the entire five-step, 24-oxidation pathway from 1,25-(OH)2D3 producing calcitroic acid.

CYP24A1 also is able to catalyse another pathway which starts with 23-hydroxylation of 1,25-(OH)2D3 and culminates in 1,25-(OH)2D3-26,23-lactone.

The side chains of the ergocalciferol (vitamin D2) derivatives, 25-OH-D2 and 1,25-(OH)2D2, are also hydroxylated by CYP24A1.

The structure of CYP24A1 is highly conserved between different species although the balance of functions can differ.  Alternatively spliced transcript variants encoding different isoforms have been found for this gene.

This enzyme plays an important  role in calcium homeostasis and the vitamin D endocrine system through its regulation of the level of vitamin D3.

Interactive pathway map

Regulation
CYP24A1 is expressed in tissues which are considered targets for vitamin D, including kidney, intestine and bone.  Transcription of the CYP24A1 gene is markedly inducible by 1,25-(OH)2D3 binding to the vitamin D receptor.  The gene has a strong, positive vitamin D response element in the promoter. Through regulation of CYP24A1 expression, a negative feedback control system is created to limit the effects of 1,25-(OH)2D3.

PTH and FGF23 also regulate CYP24A1 gene expression. Additionally, it is translationally regulated via IRES within the 5'UTR, which is responsive to an inflammatory environment.

Clinical relevance
Abnormal functioning CYP24A1 is thought to be one of the causes of severe infantile hypercalcemia.  However, increasingly patients are also being diagnosed in adulthood, often when they present with hypercalcaemia.  Patients with mutations of the CYP24A1 gene have elevated serum calcium concentrations, elevated serum 1,25-(OH)2D, suppressed PTH concentrations, hypercalciuria, nephrocalcinosis, nephrolithiasis, and sometimes reduced bone density. Variations in the gene may also be found in people with renal stones.

References

External links

Further reading